The 2022 Penn State Nittany Lions football team represented Pennsylvania State University in the 2022 NCAA Division I FBS football season as a member of the Big Ten Conference. The team was led by ninth-year head coach James Franklin. The Nittany Lions entered the season unranked for the first time since 2016. Prior to the season, the team recruited the former number one quarterback Drew Allar, and the number one running back Nicholas Singleton.

The Nittany Lions sought to improve from their previous disappointing season, where after starting 5–0, went on to lose six out of their last eight games, culminating in a loss to Arkansas in the Outback Bowl. Despite losing impact players such as Jahan Dotson, Arnold Ebiketie, and Jaquan Brisker to the NFL Draft, the Nittany Lions rebounded going 10–2, only losing to top 4 ranked Michigan and Ohio State, securing them a place in the Rose Bowl, where they would beat Utah to win their first Rose Bowl since 1995, ending the season 11–2. This marked Coach James Franklin's third New Years Six win with the Nittany Lions, and his first Rose Bowl win.

Previous season
The Nittany Lions had a promising start to the season, going 5–0 and beating a ranked Wisconsin and Auburn, to reach number 4 in the AP poll. However, during their game against #3 Iowa, quarterback Sean Clifford was injured, stalling all momentum they had, allowing Iowa to come back and beat them 23–20. The next week they played an unranked Illinois to hopefully regain momentum ahead of playing rival Ohio State on the road, however, they lost in a record-breaking 9OT. The Nittany Lions would then lose the next four of their last six games, finishing their season at 7–6 after losing to Arkansas in the Outback Bowl.

Offseason

Players drafted into the NFL

Transfers

Outgoing

Incoming 

Transfer References:

Recruiting 

Going into the 2022 season, the Nittany Lions have the #6 overall recruiting class in the country, and the #2 overall in the Big Ten.

Recruiting Reference

Preseason

Preseason Big Ten poll
Cleveland.com has polled sports journalists representing all member schools as a de facto preseason media poll since 2011. For the 2022 poll, Penn State was projected to finish third in the East Division.

Personnel

Coaching staff

Schedule

Game summaries

at Purdue

To open the season, the Nittany Lions went on the road to West Layfette to play the Purdue Boilermakers. In recent years, Purdue has been known as "The Spoilermakers," defeating high ranked opponents including #2 Ohio State, #2 Iowa, and #3 Michigan State, costing all of them potential spots in the College Football Playoff. This game was also Purdue's "Blackout" game, similar to Penn State's "Whiteout" game, further increasing the hostility of the already tough environment.  Due to these factors sport analysts thought the game would be close, with most saying Penn State would win narrowly, while some thought Purdue would upset them narrowly.       

The Nittany Lions started the game slow, allowing only a field goal in the first quarter. Penn State was able to get on the board after quarterback Sean Clifford threw a 12-yard touchdown pass to Mitchell Tinsley early in the second. Purdue answered with a touchdown of their own, making the score 10–7. In the last minutes of the quarter, the Nittany Lions scored another touchdown via a 2-yard rush by Clifford, then recovered a fumble by Purdue allowing Clifford to throw a 67-yard touchdown pass to Brenton Strange before halftime, making the score 21–10 at the end of the first half. 

Purdue received the ball at the beginning of the third quarter, scoring another touchdown via a 2-yard run from running back King Doerue. Upon receiving the ball, backup quarterback Drew Allar, the former number 1 rated quarterback of his high school class, made his debut for the Nittany Lions after Clifford experienced leg cramps as a result of a tackle made in the last minutes of the second quarter. Clifford was able to return to the game on the following drive. Purdue was able to throw a 7-yard pass to Charlie Jones for a touchdown, giving Purdue a 24–21 lead at the end of the third quarter. The Nittany Lions quickly responded with a 29-yard touchdown pass to KeAndre Lambert-Smith, giving them a 28–24 lead. The Boilermakers were forced to punt, then Clifford threw an interception to Chris Jefferson, who returned it for a 72-yard defensive touchdown, giving Purdue a 31–28 lead. The Nittany Lions were given one final chance to win the game, having 2:22 left in the fourth, and 2 timeouts, Sean Clifford was able to march them down the field and throw a 10-yard touchdown to Keyvone Lee, ending the game at 35–31.

Despite throwing an interception that was returned for a touchdown, Sean Clifford was named Big Ten co-offensive player of the week, after he completed 20-of-37 passes for 282 yards and a career-high-tying four touchdowns.

Ohio

at Auburn

Central Michigan

Northwestern

at No. 5 Michigan

Minnesota

No. 2 Ohio State

at Indiana

Maryland

at Rutgers

Michigan State

vs. No. 8 Utah (Rose Bowl)

Roster

Rankings

References

Penn State
Penn State Nittany Lions football seasons
Rose Bowl champion seasons
Penn State Nittany Lions football